Joaquín Matías Ardaiz de los Santos (born 11 January 1999) is a Uruguayan professional footballer who plays as a forward for Swiss club Luzern.

Club career

Danubio
Born in Salto, Ardaiz joined Danubio's youth setup in 2012, from Club Saladero. Promoted to the main squad ahead of the 2016 campaign, he appeared in friendlies against Brazilian sides Grêmio and Cruzeiro before making his official debut on 14 February, coming on as a second-half substitute for Marcelo Saracchi in a 1–0 away loss against Cerro.

On 21 February 2016, Ardaiz scored the equalizer in a 3–3 home draw against El Tanque Sisley. The following 16 January, he was sold to a group of English investors, having 70% of his federative rights acquired; he was assigned to El Tanque Sisley, and was immediately loaned back to Danubio.

Loan to Royal Antwerp
On 28 August 2017, Ardaiz moved abroad for the first time in his career after agreeing to a one-year loan deal with Royal Antwerp FC. He made his debut for the club on 22 September, replacing William Owusu late into a 3–0 home win against KV Kortrijk.

Ardaiz scored his first goal abroad on 29 October 2017, netting his team's first in a 2–2 away draw against Royal Excel Mouscron.

Loan to Frosinone
On 17 August 2018, Ardaiz joined Italian side Frosinone on a year-long loan with an option to buy. On 22 January 2019, Ardaiz return to Chiasso.

Loan to Vancouver Whitecaps FC
On 8 February 2019, Ardaiz joined Major League Soccer side Vancouver Whitecaps FC on a season-long loan.

Lugano
On 19 August 2020, Ardaiz joined Swiss Super League side Lugano.

Schaffhausen
On 28 July 2021, Ardaiz signed with Swiss Challenge League side FC Schaffhausen. He played every single league game for Schaffhausen and was the top scorer of the with a total of 20 goals in the 2021–22 season. He was thus instrumental in Schaffhausen reaching second place and qualifying to the promotion playoff, which they eventually lost to FC Luzern.

Luzern
On 24 June 2022, Ardaiz moved to another Swiss club Luzern on a three-year deal.

International career
Ardaiz represented Uruguay at under-15 and under-20 levels.

Personal life
Ardaiz's elder brother Matías de Los Santos is also a footballer.

Career statistics

References

External links

1999 births
Living people
Footballers from Salto, Uruguay
Uruguayan footballers
Association football forwards
Uruguayan Primera División players
Belgian Pro League players
Serie A players
Major League Soccer players
Swiss Super League players
Danubio F.C. players
Royal Antwerp F.C. players
FC Chiasso players
Frosinone Calcio players
Vancouver Whitecaps FC players
FC Lugano players
FC Schaffhausen players
FC Luzern players
Designated Players (MLS)
Uruguay youth international footballers
Uruguay under-20 international footballers
Uruguayan expatriate footballers
Uruguayan expatriate sportspeople in Belgium
Expatriate footballers in Belgium
Uruguayan expatriate sportspeople in Italy
Expatriate footballers in Italy
Uruguayan expatriate sportspeople in Canada
Expatriate soccer players in Canada
Uruguayan expatriate sportspeople in Switzerland
Expatriate footballers in Switzerland